Ghanteshwar temple is situated at Ubidpur Khanakul (near Khanakul I block office) Hooghly West Bengal India on the bank of river Ratnakar (the river is now almost dead). Lord Shiva is main worshipped deity here. The temple complex also hosts many other deities like Durga, Kaal Bhairav, Surya, Kaali, Shashti, Sitala, Dharmaraj, Radha Krishna, Annapurna, Shani etc. It also hosts a shrine for Sufi Pir (Peer) Baba. It is also home to many Bengal folk festival like Neel Puja, Gajan, Shivratri, Bhimekadashi, Ratha Yatra etc.

Main entrance of the temple complex has below inscription:

বীরভূমৌ সিদ্ধিনাথো রাঢ়েচাঃ তারকেশ্বর

ঘন্টেশ্বরশ্চ দেবেশি রত্নাকর নদীতটে

Locals believe that the same shiva linga is being worshipped for over 500 years. The temple complex as seen today is said to be created by local Zamindar(Landlord) Bipin Bihari Sinha in 1943 when a flood caused major damage to the earlier construction.

Transport 
RAILWAY TRANSPORTATION:

Nearby rail stations are Tarakeswar, Arambagh or Mayapur (Hooghly).

ROAD TRANSPORTATION:

The temple is easily accessible via road transportation. Available bus routes are:
 Arambagh - Garerghat
 Arambagh - Ganeshpur
 Tarakeswar - Garerghat
 Tarakeswar - Ganeshpur
 Burdwan - Garerghat (via Arambagh)
One travelling from Ghatal side can come to Ranichak, take the river transportation to Garerghat and avail buses from there. From Bagnan/Amta side, buses are available from Jhikira/Muchighata to Ganeshpur.

Hindu temples in West Bengal
Tourist attractions in Hooghly district